Lisson Green is described as a hamlet in the Domesday book in 1086, the edges of the settlement defined by the two current Edgware Road stations facing onto Edgware Road or Watling Street as it was previously known, one of the main Roman thoroughfares in and out of London. Occasionally referred to as Lissom Grove, originally Lisson Grove was part of the medieval manor of Lilestone which stretched as far as Hampstead. Lisson Green as a manor broke away c. 1236 with its own manor house. Paddington Green formed part of the original Lilestone estate.

One of Lisson Green village's first attractions would have been the Yorkshire Stingo, a public house probably visited by Samuel Pepys in 1666 on a visit with a flirtatious widow. Stingo was the name of a particular Yorkshire ale. On Saturdays during the 1780s, lascars, former sailors from Bengal, Yemen, Portuguese Goa employed by the East India Company left stranded and destitute in London would gather to receive a small subsidy.

18th century
Until the late 18th century the district remained essentially rural. The Austrian composer Joseph Haydn moved briefly to a farm in Lisson Grove in the spring of 1791 in order to have quiet surroundings in which to compose during his three-year stay in England. The historical painter Benjamin Haydon described a Lisson Grove dinner party with William Wordsworth, John Keats and Charles Lamb at which Lamb got drunk and berated the ‘rascally Lake poet' for calling Voltaire a dull fellow.
In 1792 The Philological School was opened on the corner of Lisson Grove and Marylebone Road.

19th century 
Nowadays Lisson Grove is a much improved section of West London, but for over a hundred years it was one of the capital's worst slums. The area was notorious for drinking, crime and prostitution, as well as the extreme poverty of the people and the squalor and dilapidation of the homes they lived in. Local police officers only patrolled the district in pairs, and they described the women of the area as the most drunken, violent and foul-mouthed in all London. The Grove being between Marylebone and Paddington railway stations, and on top of a busy midsection of Regent's Canal, the industrialisation of the area was swift during the 19th century transforming the area from a pastoral outpost on the north western edge of London into a crossroads for goods, cargo and passengers.
In 1880 the most substantial building in the road, Portman Buildings, was erected.

Regent's Canal arrived in rural Lisson Grove in 1810 and with the construction of Eyre's Tunnel or Lisson Grove Tunnel under Aberdeen Place in 1816 and Marylebone railway station by H W Braddock for the Great Central Railway on the Portman Nursery site at the end of the century, the rural Lisson Grove was quickly engulfed by the expanding city during the 1800s.

The Regency Era (1811–1820): William Blake, the Shoreham Ancients and The Brazen Head public house 
It was during the early 1800s that painters from the Royal Academy, including a coterie of various student artists calling themselves the Shoreham Ancients inspired and congregating around William Blake, began to settle in and around Lisson Grove. In 1812, John Linnell, who was to become a major patron of Blake's work, visited his friend Charles Heathcote Tatham, an architect who had built himself a majestic house in the open fields of the area of Lisson Grove between Park Road and Lisson Grove (the road) to paint the view of the surrounding fields of his garden. No. 34 Alpha Cottages is memorialised in the name of a block of flats on Ashmill Street, opposite Ranston (formerly Charles) Street and Cosway Street.

One such friend and colleague of Blake was Richard Cosway whose studio on Stafford Street was renamed as Cosway Street. "Cosway was not only a famous and fashionable painter; he was also a mesmerist and magician who practised arcana related to alchemical and cabbalistic teaching. There are reports of erotic ceremonies, the imbibing of drugs or 'elixirs', and ritual nudity. Blake was no stranger to the symbols or beliefs of a man such as Cosway – the manuscript of the poem he was writing contains many drawings of bizarre sexual imagery, including women sporting giant phalli and children engaged in erotic practices with adults."

In 1829 the Catholic church of Our Lady was built. Designed by J.J. Scoles in the new Gothic style, it was one of the first Catholic churches following the Catholic Emancipation Act. Nearby on Harewood Avenue the Convent of the Sisters of Mercy was also established as part of the Catholic Mission in St. John's Wood, serving the large Irish community attracted by the railway, canal and construction work.  The same year George Shillibeer operated the first London omnibus from the Yorkshire Stingo taking passengers to Bank.

Lisson Grove hosted the first of London's Victorian Turkish baths—which were to become a fashionable trend towards the latter half of the 19th century—when Roger Evans established one in 1860 at his house on Bell Street.

A critical social commentary reads: 

Hollingshead was, of course, referring only to the first such bath in London. The first Victorian Turkish bath was actually built near Cork in Ireland in 1856, while the first in England opened in Manchester in 1857.

During the latter part of the 19th century a number of artisans and workers' flats and cottages sprang up from social housing initiatives spearheaded by Octavia Hill and the Peabody Trust. Across the road from The Green Man Inn, in 1884 Miles Building was built by the Improved Industrial Dwellings Association, facing Bell Street and Penfold Place.

The lost North Bank and South Bank Nash villas 
John Nash as a director of the Regent's Canal Company formed in 1812 began building detached villas set in gardens facing onto either side of the section of the canal running parallel to Lodge Road. Ultimately destroyed in 1900 in order to make way for St John's Wood electricity sub-station (North Bank) and Lisson Grove housing estate (South Bank) the enclave of distinctive white villas bisected by the picturesque banks of the canal attracted a literary and journalist set such as George Eliot, along with East India Dock Company employees with a working interest in being near the villas along Lodge Road.

"North and South Bank, have charming, if somewhat dilapidated streets of small villas standing in their own gardens, that ran down to the water and towpath either side of the canal. Incidentally these streets, owing to the eccentricities of some of the inhabitants, and the secrecy provided by the high walls of the gardens, had acquired a somewhat sinister reputation."  In 1836 the North Bank was mentioned as being associated with scandal in a local history 'at this point the East India Dock Company whose employees were fairly thick on the ground in St John's Wood'.

While Nash was developing his villas in the north east of Lisson Grove, nearest Regent's Park, Sir Edward Baker (who gave his name to Baker Street) acquired the southern part of Lisson Green in 1821 and built large blocks of flats as an extension of Marylebone. From 1825 Sir Edwin Landseer moved to No 1, St John's Wood Road on the corner of Lisson Grove in a small cottage on the site of Punker's Barn. The journalist George Augustus Henry Sala born in 1828, recalls growing up in Lisson Grove during the 1830s "when the principle public buildings were pawnbrokers, and 'leaving shops', low public houses and beershops and cheap undertakers."

1885: The Eliza Armstrong Scandal 

The fictional Eliza Doolittle was born and raised in Lisson Grove and had to pay "four and six a week for a room that wasn't fit for a pig to live in" before coming under the tutelage of Professor Henry Higgins. These characters from George Bernard Shaw's Pygmalion are best known to modern audiences from the Lerner and Loewe musical and film adaptation of the play, entitled My Fair Lady. In 1885 the case of 13-year-old Eliza Armstrong, who was sold to a brothel keeper for £5, caused such an outcry that the law was changed and so was the name of the street where she lived (from Charles Street to Ranston Street), such was the dishonourable reputation it had gained.

The Fever Dens of Charles Street 
Lisson Grove was then an area of slum housing with single room tenements. According to the Medical Officer in 1881 "Charles Street contains 33 houses and has a population of 423 all told, that the rooms are let out in tenements, nearly every room being occupied by a family".

In 1881 an editorial in the Marylebone Mercury during an outbreak of typhus fever gives a description of the area.

The Medical Officer employed by the Board of Guardians, Dr Norman Kerr, wrote a letter to the local paper about the outbreak:

Action was then taken by the Vestry.

Improvements 
It was not until 1898 that major changes were recommended.

In 1890 construction began on Marylebone Railway, completing almost a decade later in 1899. In 1894 Landseer's house was destroyed to make way for railway artisan homes. Penfold Street was to become dominated by the Great Central Goods Depot Yard, along which a number of public houses sprang up: the "Lord Frampton" (now residential flats), the "Richmond Arms" and "The Crown Hotel" (known as Crocker's Folly since 1987). In 1886–96 the newly named Ranston Street saw a number of Almond & St Botolphs Cottages (Nos. 14–19) built under the initiative of social reformer Octavia Hill. As a strong advocate of small scale housing, cottages and mixed developments, she described these cottages as an experimental form of 'compound housing' e.g. maisonettes in her 1897 Letter to Fellow Workers.

In 1897, local entrepreneur Frank Crocker, who also owned "The Volunteer" in Kilburn, had architect C. H. Worley of Welbeck Street draw up plans for an ornately eclectic public house "The Crown Hotel", to be renamed "Crocker's Folly" from 1987, on the corner of Aberdeen Place and Cunningham Place, housing several Saloon bars on the ground floor with a hotel, dining rooms and a concert room on the floors above. Grade II* listed, it is currently under refurbishment as at September 2013.

20th century 
In 1903 the Home for Female Orphans was on the corner of Lisson Grove and St John's Wood Road. In November 1906 Henry Sylvester Williams (b.1867 – d.1911), a Trinidadian lawyer and anti-slavery and civil rights campaigner, was elected to the St Marylebone Borough Council for Church Street Ward as the first black councillor in what is now the City of Westminster. A green plaque at 38 Church Street marks where Williams lived from 1906 to 1908. Edgware Road (Bakerloo line) underground station opened in 1907 in a narrow parade of shops, with exits onto Edgware Road and Bell Street.

Following World War One, Lloyd George announced "homes fit for heroes", leading to a housing boom from which Lisson Grove was to benefit. In 1924, Fisherton Street estate was completed by St Marylebone Council with seven apartment blocks in red-brick neo-Georgian style with high mansard roofs grouped around two courtyards. Noted for their innovation as some of the first social housing to include an indoor bathroom and toilet, in 1990 the estate was defined as the Fisherton Street Conservation Area The blocks were named mostly for the notable former residents of Lisson Grove and its surrounding areas, which drew Victorian landscape painters, sculptors, portraitists and architects:

 Lilestone: Named in reference to the medieval manor stretching to Hampstead before Lisson Grove became a separate manor in the 13th century 
 Huxley: Thomas Henry Huxley the self-taught biologist and ardent Charles Darwin supporter was resident at 41 North Bank during the 1850s. 
 Gibbons: Grinling Gibbons (1648–1721) a master carver who worked on St Pauls 
 Landseer: Sir Edwin Landseer (famous for sculpting the lions in Trafalgar Square)
 Capland:
 Frith: For sculptor William Silver Frith (1850–1924)
 Orchardson: For painter Sir William Quiller Orchardson (1832–1910)
 Dicksee: For Sir Francis Dicksee, a noted Victorian painter
 Eastlake: For Charles Eastlake (1836–1906) British architect and furniture designer
 Tadema: For Sir Lawrence Alma-Tadema
 Poynter: For Sir Edward Poynter (1836–1919)
 Stanfield: George Clarkson Stanfield and his son, both artists.
 Frampton: George Frampton the sculptor had lived nearby at Carlton Hill from 1910 and may have given his name to Frampton Street and Frampton House
 Wyatt: Matthew Cote Wyatt who lived at Dudley Grove House, Paddington

After the First World War dining rooms at 35 Lisson Grove became a fish bar, called the Sea Shell from 1964. Now on the corner of Shroton Street, the restaurant is one of London's most highly rated fish and chip shops.

In 1960 the first Labour Exchange was established on Lisson Grove to much fanfare, and later featured in punk music history as the place where Joe Strummer was to meet fellow Clash members Mick Jones and Paul Simonon while signing on.

References

History of London by locality
Areas of London
Former slums of London